Little Trefoil Island  is a small island with an area of 0.64 ha, in south-eastern Australia. It is part of Tasmania’s Trefoil Island Group, lying close to Cape Grim, Tasmania's most north-westerly point, in Bass Strait.

Fauna
The island forms part of the Hunter Island Group Important Bird Area.  Breeding seabird and shorebird species include little penguin, common diving-petrel, Pacific gull, silver gull and sooty oystercatcher. The metallic skink is present.

References

North West Tasmania
Important Bird Areas of Tasmania
Islands of Bass Strait